Thor is an unincorporated community in Lee Township, Aitkin County, Minnesota, United States. The community is located along Aitkin County Road 4 (Dam Lake Street) near the junction with 275th Place. Nearby places include Aitkin, Glen, East Lake, McGregor, and Rice Lake National Wildlife Refuge.

References

Unincorporated communities in Aitkin County, Minnesota
Unincorporated communities in Minnesota